This is a list of diplomatic missions of Paraguay. Paraguay is landlocked between two South American giants, Brazil and Argentina, and therefore it has several consulates in both countries. It is also one of the most significant countries and the only South American country to have an embassy in Taipei instead of Beijing.

Current missions

Africa

Americas

Asia

Europe

Oceania

Multilateral organisations

Gallery

Closed missions

Americas

Europe

See also
Foreign relations of Paraguay
Visa policy of Paraguay

Notes

References

External links

 Ministry of Foreign Relations of Paraguay

Paraguay
Diplomatic missions